The following is the order of battle of the forces involved in the Battle of Shanghai, during the opening stages of the Second Sino-Japanese War.

Order of battle prior to August 13, 1937

China 

National Revolutionary Army
Wusung – Shanghai Siege Area (Aug. 7 1937)
Nanking Shanghai Garrison – Zhang Zhizhong (50,000 men).
36th Division – Song Xilian[g]
87th Division – Wang Chingchin[g]
88th Division – Sun Yuanliang[g]
55th Division – Li Sungchan
56th Division – Liu Hoting (later Liu Shangchih)
57th Division – Yuan Chaochang [R] 
20th Sep. Bde – Gen. Chen Mienwu

[g] German trained Reorganized Divisions 
[R] Reorganized Divisions

Shanghai City demilitarised on Chinese side according to Shanghai Ceasefire Agreement (1932)
Wusong-Shanghai Garrison Units (Peace Preservation Corps)

Centralized Chinese Air Force Units (includes former aviators of various warlord air forces and Chinese-American Volunteers)
Zhoujiakou Airbase, Zhoukou, Henan – 4th Pursuit Group - Col. Gao Zhihang (21st, 22nd, 23rd Pursuit Squadrons).
Jurong Airbase, Nanjing, Jiangsu - 3rd Pursuit Group - Capt. Wong Pan-Yang (8th, 17th Pursuit Squadrons and 34th Provisional PS) - 5th Pursuit Group - Capt. Chan Kee-Wong (28th PS)

Japan 

Imperial Japanese Navy

3rd Fleet : Admiral Hasegawa Kiyoshi
 Flagship: Izumo (Izumo class armoured cruiser) 
 Notoro (seaplane tender) 
 8 Nakajima E8N Reconnaissance float aircraft
 11th (Gunboat) Sentai - Rear Admiral Tanimoto Umataro
 Flagship: Yaeyama (minelayer)
 Ataka (Gunboat)
 Katada (Gunboat) 
 Sumida (Gunboat) 
 Kuri (Momi class destroyer) 
 Hozu (Gunboat) 
 Futami (Gunboat)
 Kotaka (Gunboat) 
 Tsuga (Momi class destroyer)
 Hasu (Momi class destroyer)
 Atami (Gunboat)
 Seta (Gunboat
 Toba (Gunboat) 
 Hira (Gunboat)
 8th (Cruiser) Sentai  - Rear Admiral Nagumo 
 Flagship: Kinu 
 Natori 
 Yura
 1st (Destroyer) Sentai - Rear Admiral Yoshida  
 Sendai
Shanghai Special Naval Landing Force - Rear Admiral Denshichi Okawachi
1st Battalion - Lt. Cdr. Uroku Hashimoto 
2nd Battalion - Lt. Shigeshi Sano
3rd Battalion - Lt. Shegeru Ito 
4th Battalion - Artillery unit, Disbanded at the outbreak of war, guns were dispersed to the infantry units.
9th Battalion - Lt. Cdr. Torashige Tsukioka 
Prior to hostilities: Total force (2,500 men)

Special Naval Landing Force reinforcements as of 8/1/37 from 3rd Fleet
 8th Sentai NLF
 1st Destroyer Sentai NLF
 3rd Destroyer Sentai NLF
 Izumo NLF

Reservists and volunteers (5000 men) 
1st Reserve Infantry Regiment 
2nd Reserve Infantry Regiment 
(Armed reservists were men in civilian clothes distinguished by a brassard)

 Notes:
 Third Fleet operated in Central and South China waters. 
 11th Squadron evacuated Japanese civilians from the interior to Shanghai during July and early August.

Order of battle soon after August 13, 1937

China 

National Revolutionary Army

3rd Military Region - Generalissimo Chiang Kai-shek (20 Aug 1937)

Wusung – Shanghai Siege Area
9th Group Army - Gen. Zhang Zhizhong
36th Division - Gen. Song Xilian[g]
56th Division - Gen. Liu Hoting
87th Division - Gen. Wang Chingchin[g]
88th Division - Gen. Sun Yuanliang[g]
20th Separate Brigade - Gen. Chen Mienwu
Training Division (part) - Gen Huei Yungching
Wusong-Shanghai Garrison Units (Peace Preservation Corps)
10th Heavy Artillery Regiment [sFH 18 L/32 150mm Howitzer]
3rd Artillery Regiment
8th Artillery Regiment
2 Heavy Mortar Units
2 Anti-tank batteries
1 Light Tank Battalion

Yangtse River Right Bank Garrison Sector
54th Army – Gen. Huo Kweichang
11th Division – Gen. Peng Shan[R]
14th Division - Gen. Chen Lie[g]
67th Division - Gen. Huang Wei[R]
16th Artillery Regiment (under command of Siege Area)

Yangtse River Left Bank Garrison Sector
57th Army – Miao Chengliu
111th Division – Gen. Chen Ento
112th Division – Gen. Huo Shuoyi

Hangchow Bay Left Bank Garrison Sector
8th Group Army – Gen. Zhang Fakui
61st Division – Gen. Chung Sung 
62nd Division – Gen. Tao Liu
55th Division – Gen. Li Sungshan
57th Division – Gen. Yuan Shaochang[R]
45th Separate Brigade – Gen. Chan Luanchi
2nd Artillery Regt.

East Chekiang Garrison Sector
10th Group Army – Gen. Liu Jianxu
16th Division – Gen. Peng Shungling
63rd Division – Gen. Chen Kuangchung
19th Division – Gen. Li Chue
52nd Division – Gen. Lu Xinjung
New 34th Division (128th Division) - Gen. Gu Chiachi
37th Separate Brigade – Gen. Chen The-fa
11th Provisional Brigade – Gen Chou Xiching
12th Provisional Brigade – Gen. Li Kuochun
13th Provisional Brigade – Gen. Yang Yungching

[g] German trained Reorganized Divisions
[R] Reorganized Divisions

Chinese Air Force Units - includes former aviators of various warlord air forces plus Chinese-American Volunteers
Jianqiao Airbase, Hangzhou, Zhejiang – 4th Pursuit Group - Col. Gao Zhihang (21st, 22nd, 23rd Pursuit Squadrons); Capt. Li Guidan assumed command of the 4th PG following Col. Gao's combat injuries sustained on 15 August, that put him out of action for two months.
Jurong Airbase, Nanjing, Jiangsu - 3rd Pursuit Group - Capt. Wong Pan-Yang (8th, 17th Pursuit Squadrons and 34th Provisional PS) - 5th Pursuit Group - Capt. Chan Kee-Wong (28th PS)

Japan 

Imperial Japanese Navy

Shanghai Special Naval Landing Force - Rear Admiral Denshichi Okawachi
1st Battalion
2nd Battalion
3rd Battalion
4th Battalion
9th Battalion
Special Naval Landing Force reinforcements as of 1 Aug from 3rd Fleet
8th Sentai NLF
1st Destroyer Sentai NLF
3rd Destroyer Sentai NLF
Izumo NLF
Special Naval Landing Force reinforcements 18 - 19 Aug
5th Battalion (Sasebo 1st SNLF, 16th Destroyer Division)
6th Battalion (Kure 2nd SNLF)
7th Battalion (Kure 1st SNLF)
8th Battalion (Yokosuka 1st SNLF, 11th Sentai)

Total Naval personnel 8/19/37 (5000 men) 

Reservists and volunteers (5000 men)
1st Reserve Infantry Regiment 
2nd Reserve Infantry Regiment 
 (Armed reservists were men in civilian clothes distinguished by a brassard)

 Total force defending the settlement 10,000 men 

Imperial Japanese Army

Shanghai Expeditionary Force – Gen. Iwane Matsui (16 Aug 1937)
5th Tank Battalion - Colonel Hosomi
 32 Type 89 Medium Tanks, 15 Type 94 Tankettes
7th Independent Machine Gun Battalion 
8th Independent Light Armor Company
9th Independent Light Armor Company
Independent Light Armor Company
10th Field Heavy Artillery Regiment
24 Type 4 150mm Howitzers
4th Army Mortar Battalion
150mm mortars (1887) [Taki/PWf]
Field Operations Anti-aircraft Artillery 3 platoons
Field Air Defense Team 3rd Battery
8th Independent Army Engineer Regiment
6th Independent Air Squadron
Shanghai Dispatch Signal Unit
5th Independent Heavy Artillery Brigade
48 150mm Howitzers
6th Independent heavy artillery Brigade
13th Field Heavy Artillery Regiments, 24 Type 4 15cm Howitzers
14th Field Heavy Artillery Regiments, 24 Type 4 15cm Howitzers
Army Logistics Depot

3rd Division - Lt. Gen. Fujita (Landed on Aug. 23rd)
5th Infantry Brigade
6th Infantry Regiment
68th Infantry Regiment
29th Infantry Brigade
18th Infantry Regiment
34th Infantry Regiment
3rd Field Artillery Regiment
3rd Cavalry Regiment
3rd Engineer Regiment
3rd Transport Regiment

11th Division - Lt. Gen. Yamamuro (Landed on Aug. 23rd) 
10th Infantry Brigade
12th Infantry Regiment
22nd Infantry Regiment
22nd Infantry Brigade
43rd Infantry Regiment
44th Infantry Regiment
11th Mountain Artillery Regiment
11th Cavalry Regiment
11th Engineer Regiment
11th Transport Regiment

101st Division - Lt. Gen. Ito (Arrived Sept 7-16, Landed on Sep. 22nd) 
 101st Infantry Brigade
 101st Infantry Regiment
 149th Infantry Regiment
 102nd Infantry Brigade
 103rd Infantry Regiment
 157th Infantry Regiment
 101st Field Artillery Regiment
 101st Cavalry Regiment
 101st Engineer Regiment
 101st Transport Regiment

9th Division - Lt. Gen. Yoshizumi (Landed on Sep. 27th)
6th Infantry Brigade
7th Infantry Regiment
35th Infantry Regiment
18th Infantry Brigade				
19th Infantry Regiment
36th Infantry Regiment
9th Mountain Artillery Regiment
9th Cavalry Regiment
9th Engineer Regiment
9th Transport Regiment

13th Division - Lt. Gen. Ogisu (reinforcements late Aug., Landed on Oct. 1st)
26th Infantry Brigade
58th Infantry Regiment
116th Infantry Regiment
103rd Infantry Brigade
65th Infantry Regiment
104th Infantry Regiment
19th Mountain Artillery Regiment
17th Cavalry Regiment
13th Engineer Regiment
13th Transport Regiment

Later forces

Chinese forces after late September, 1937

National Revolutionary Army
3rd War Area - Generalisimo Chiang Kai-skek (after late Sept. 1937)

Right Wing Force - General Zhang Fakui 
8th Group Army - General Zhang Fakui
28th Army - Tao Kuang
62nd Division – Tao Kuang
63rd Division – Chen Kuangchung
55th Division – Li Sungchan
45th Separate Brigade – Chang Luanchi
Artillery Btn., Training Div. 
10th Group Army - Liu Jianxu
11th Reserve Division – Hu –Ta
128th Division – Ku Chiachi
45th Division – Tai Minchuan
52nd Division – Lu Xinjung
11th Temporary Brigade – Chou Xiching
12th Temporary Brigade – Li Kuochun
37th Separate Brigade - Chen Thefa
Guard Regiment – ?
Ningpo Defense Commander – Wan Kaolan

Central Force Gen. Zhu Shaoliang 
 9th Group Army - Zhu Shaoliang
 72nd Army – Sun Yuanliang 
88th Division – Sun Yuanliang[g]
Peace Preservation Group 
1st Regiment, 20th Separate Brigade
78th Army – Song Xilian
36th Division – Song Xilian[g]
71st Army – Wang Chingchin
87th Division – Wang Chingchin[g]
8th Army – Huang Chie
61st Division – Chung Sung
Salt Gabelle Division – Huang Chie  
3rd Division – Li Yutang[g]
18th Division – Chu Yao-hua
Shanghai Garrison Command - Yang Hu
1st Battalion 3rd Regiment, 2nd Artillery Brigade
2 Heavy Mortar Units
2 Anti-tank batteries
1 Light tank Battalion
21st Group Army - Liao Lei
1st Army – Hu Zongnan
1st Division - Li Tiechun
32nd Division - Wang Xiushen
78th Division  - Li Wen
48th Army – Wei Yunsung
173rd Division - Huo Weichen
174th Division - Wang Tsanpin
176th Division - Ou Shounien
171st Division – Yang Cunchang
19th Division – Li Chue
16th Division - Peng Sungling

Left Wing Force - General Chen Cheng
19th Group Army – Xue Yue
66th Army – Ye Zhao
159th Division –  Tan Sui
160th Division – Ye Zhao
75th Army – Chao Ai
6th Division – Chao Ai[g]
2nd Army – Li Yannian
9th Division – Li Yannian[g]
25th Army – Wan Yaohuang
13th Division – Wan Yaohuang
20th Army – Yang Sen
133rd Division – Yang Hanyu
134th Division – Yang Hanchung
69th Army – Yuan Chaochang
57th Division  – Yuan Chaochang[R]
15th Group Army – Luo Zhuoying
44th Division – Chen Yung
16th Artillery Regiment
16th Corps – Luo Zhuoying
18th Army - Luo Zhuoying
60th Division - Chen Pei
11th Division - Peng Shan[R]
67th Division - Huag Wei[R]
54th Army - Huo Kueichang
14th Division - Chen Lie[g]
98th Division - Hisa Chuchung
74th Army - Yu Chishi
51st Division  - Wang Yaowu
58th Division  - Yu Chishih
39th Army – Liu Ho-ting
34th Separate Brigade. – Lo Chichiang
56th Division  - Liu Shangchih
4th Army – Wu Chi-wei
90th Division – Ou Chen
73rd Army – Wang Tungyuan
15th Division – Wang Chihpin
15th Corps – Liu Xing
102 Division - Po Huichang
103 Division - Ho Chihchung
53 Division - Li Yunheng
23 Division - Li Pifan
57th Army – Miao Chengliu
111th Division - Chang Entuo
112th Division - Huo Shouyi
River Defence Forces - Gen. Liu Xing
Chiangyin Fortress Command - Xu Kang 
Chenchiang Fortress Command - Lin Xienyang
2nd Regiment Kiangsu Peace Preservation Force 
1st Battalion 8th Artillery Regiment
11th Corps - Shangguan Yunxiang
40th Division - Liu Peixu
33rd Division  - Ma Xingxien	
12th Corps - Chang Fang
76th Division - Wang Lingyun
43rd Army - Kuo Jutung
26th Div. - Liu Yuching
1st Battalion 3rd Artillery Regiment 
4th Artillery Regiment
1st Battalion 10th Heavy Artillery Regiment [sFH 18 L/32 150mm How]

Notes:
[g] German trained Reorganized Divisions: 
[R] Reorganized Divisions

Japanese forces from October 29, 1937

Imperial Japanese Army

Central China Front Army –  Gen. Iwane Matsui 
 (was formed on Oct. 29th 1937 to coordinate the Shanghai Expeditionary Army and
the 10th Army.)

 Shanghai Expeditionary Force - Gen. Iwane Matsui, 
See previous order of battle

16th Division – Gen. Kesao Nakashima (from N. China Nov 12/37, landed at Pai mao kou)
19th Infantry Brigade
 9th Infantry Regiment
 20th Infantry Regiment
30th Infantry Brigade
 33rd Infantry Regiment
 38th Infantry Regiment
22nd Field Artillery Regiment
20th Cavalry Regiment
16th Engineer Regiment
16th Transport Regiment

Shigeto Detachment - Major Gen. Shigeto (arrived Sept 7-16 from Formosa)
Regiment sized, was later expanded into the Formosa Mixed Brigade. Nov 12/37, landed at Pai mao kou)

 ? Manchukuoan Brigade - Li Chung-shan (arrived Sept. 7-16)
 ? Manchukuoan Brigade - Yu Chih-shan (arrived Sept. 7-16)

10th Army – Major Gen. Heisuke Yamagawa (Nov. 5th landing at Chin shan wei)
9th Independent Light Armor Company [Taki/ PWf]
2nd Independent Mountain Gun Regiment[Taki/ PWf]
6th Independent Heavy Artillery Brigade [CDF] [Taki/ PWf]
13th Field Heavy Artillery Regiment, 24 Type 4 15cm Howitzers
14th Field Heavy Artillery Regiment, 24 Type 4 15cm Howitzers

6th Division - Lt. Gen. Tani
11th Infantry Brigade				
13th Infantry Regiment
47th Infantry Regiment				
36th Infantry Brigade				
23rd Infantry Regiment				
45th Infantry Regiment				
6th Field Artillery Regiment			
6th Cavalry Regiment				
6th Engineer Regiment				
6th Transport Regiment				

18th Division - Lt. Gen. Ushijima 
23rd Infantry Brigade
55th Infantry Regiment
56th Infantry Regiment
35th Infantry Brigade
114th Infantry Regiment
124th Infantry Regiment
18th Mountain Artillery Regiment
22nd Cavalry Battalion
12th Engineer Regiment
12th Transport Regiment

114th Division - Lt. Gen. Suematsu 
127th Infantry Brigade
66th Infantry Regiment
115th Infantry Regiment
128th Infantry Brigade
102nd Infantry Regiment
150th Infantry Regiment
120th Field Artillery Regt
118th Cavalry Regiment
114th Engineer Regiment
114th Transport Regiment

 Kunizaki Detachment - Gen. Kunisaki (from North China)
9th Infantry Brigade/5th Division
11th Infantry Regiment
41st Infantry Regiment
with elements of:
5th Mountain Artillery Regiment
5th Cavalry Regiment
5th Engineer Regiment
5th Transport Regiment

Sources 
 Hsu Long-hsuen and Chang Ming-kai, History of The Sino-Japanese War (1937-1945) 2nd Ed., 1971. Translated by Wen Ha-hsiung, Chung Wu Publishing; 33, 140th Lane, Tung-hwa Street, Taipei, Taiwan Republic of China.  Pg. 200 - 214, Map 7.
 Jowett, Phillip S., Rays of The Rising Sun, Armed Forces of Japan’s Asian Allies 1931-45, Volume I: China & Manchuria, 2004. Helion & Co. Ltd., 26 Willow Rd., Solihull, West Midlands, England.
 Sino-Japanese Air War 1937-45
 History of the Frontal War Zone in the Sino-Japanese War, published by Nanjing University Press.
 [g] German trained Reorganized Divisions: 
3rd, 6th, 9th, 14th, 36th, 87th, 88th, and the Training Division of the Central Military Academy.

Also the "Tax Police" regiment (equivalent of a division) under T.V. Soong's Ministry of Finance, later converted to the New 38th Division during the war, were German armed and trained by German officers.

[R] Reorganized Divisions were the other 12 other Divisions with Chinese arms on the reorganized model with 2  German advisors:

2nd,  4th, 10th, 11th, 25th, 27th, 57th, 67th, 80th, 83rd, 89th Division

 Madej, W. Victor, Japanese Armed Forces Order of Battle, 1937-1945 [2 vols], Allentown, PA: 1981.

External links 
 Monograph 144 Chapter II 
 Chinese_Tank_Forces_and_Battles_before_1945
 Taki’s IMPERIAL JAPANESE ARMY PAGE 
 Forum: Pacific War 1941-1945, discussion about Shanghai Defense force Aug. 11 1937 
Photos of the Shanghai fighting 1937

Battles of the Second Sino-Japanese War
Second Sino-Japanese War orders of battle